The New Sounds of Maynard Ferguson is an album by Canadian jazz trumpeter Maynard Ferguson recorded in 1963 which was originally released on the Cameo label.

Reception 

AllMusic reviewer Matt Collar stated "Featuring arrangements by Don Sebesky, the albums showcased Ferguson's swinging and powerful high-note-centric style backed by his always dynamic ensemble".

Track listing 
 "Take the "A" Train" (Billy Strayhorn) – 2:48
 "Bossa Nova de Funk"  (Willie Maiden) – 5:34
 "Gravy Waltz"  (Steve Allen, Ray Brown) – 4:10
 "Cherokee (Indian Love Song)" (Ray Noble) – 4:23
 "I'm Getting Sentimental Over You" (George Bassman, Ned Washington) – 3:15
 " One O'Clock Jump" (Count Basie) – 5:57 	
 "At the Sound of the Trumpet" (Maynard Ferguson, Maiden) – 4:44
 "Maine Bone" (Mike Abene) – 3:03
 "Watermelon Man" (Herbie Hancock) – 2:24 	
 "Danny Boy" (Traditional) – 3:55

Note
Recorded at Fine Recording Studios in Queens, New York on March 27, 1963 (tracks 1, 3, 5, 6 & 10) and March 28, 1963 (tracks 2, 4 & 7-9)

Personnel 
Maynard Ferguson – trumpet, valve trombone, French horn
Dusan Goykovitch, Nat Pavone, Rick Kiefer – trumpet
Don Doane, Kenny Rupp – trombone
Lanny Morgan – alto saxophone
Willie Maiden, Frank Vicari – tenor saxophone
Ronnie Cuber – baritone saxophone
Mike Abene – piano
Linc Milliman – bass
Rufus Jones – drums
Mike Abene (tracks 4 & 8), Willie Maiden (tracks 2, 3, 5, 7, 9 & 10), Don Sebesky (tracks 1 & 6) – arrangers

References 

1963 albums
Maynard Ferguson albums
Cameo-Parkway Records albums
Albums arranged by Don Sebesky